The 2000 William & Mary Tribe football team represented the College of William & Mary as member of the Atlantic 10 Conference (A-10) during the 2000 NCAA Division I-AA football season. Led by Jimmye Laycock in his 21st year as head coach, William & Mary finished the season with an overall record of 5–6 and a mark of 4–4 in A-10 play, tying for fourth place.

Schedule

References

William and Mary
William & Mary Tribe football seasons
William and Mary Indians football